Hassan Ahmed El-Shazly (Egyptian Arabic: حسن الشاذلي, Hassan El Shazly) (13 November 1943 – 20 April 2015) was an Egyptian footballer. El-Shazly is considered as a historic player of Tersana. He was described as a "devastating shooter" and "lethal with both feet".

Career
El-Shazly played club football for the Egyptian team Tersana. He led Tersana to its only Egyptian League title in the 1963 season. He was the Egyptian Premier League top goalscorer for four times. As of 2010, this is an Egyptian record that still holds. He scored 34 goals as the top league scorer of  1974–75 Egyptian Premier League season, a one-season record that still stands. This was done at a relative old age; he was 32 years old.

He also represented the Egypt national football team, and scored six goals at the 1963 African Cup of Nations.

Club career statistics

Honours 
Tersana
 Egyptian Premier League: 1962–63
 Egyptian Cup: 1964–65, 1966–67

Individual
 Egyptian Premier League Top scorer: 1962–63, 1964–65, 1965–66, 1974–75
 Africa Cup of Nations Top scorer: 1963
 Africa Cup of Nations Top Egyptian scorer: 13 Goals
 Egyptian Premier League Highest-ever goalscorer: 173 Goals

References

Tersana SC players
Egyptian footballers
Egypt international footballers
Egyptian football managers
1963 African Cup of Nations players
1970 African Cup of Nations players
1974 African Cup of Nations players
Competitors at the 1963 Mediterranean Games
1943 births
2015 deaths
Association football forwards
Association football midfielders
Mediterranean Games competitors for Egypt